Raisa may refer to
Raisa (given name)
Raisa (surname)
Raisa (album) by Raisa Andriana
Raisa (film), a 2015 Romanian short film
Raisa (singer), an Indonesian singer-songwriter